Disney XD is a British-managed Polish television channel owned and operated and The Walt Disney Company Limited.

It was originally launched as Fox Kids on 18 April 1998, relaunched as Jetix on 1 January 2005, and currently as Disney XD on 19 September 2009. The targeted ages are 6 to 15 years old. Since 10 April 2014, the channel broadcasts for 24 hours a day; previously the channel was on-air for 18 hours, from 6:00 a.m. to midnight.

Programming

Currently and formerly
Aaron Stone
American Dragon: Jake Long
Amphibia
The Avengers: Earth's Mightiest Heroes
Avengers Assemble
Big City Greens
Big Hero 6: The Series
Boy Girl Dog Cat Mouse Cheese
Disney 11
DuckTales
DuckTales (2017 TV series)
Fish Hooks
Gravity Falls
Guardians of the Galaxy
Have a Laugh!
Hotel Transylvania: The Series
Hulk and the Agents of S.M.A.S.H.
Iron Man: Armored Adventures
Jimmy Two-Shoes
Kick Buttowski
Kickin' It
Kid vs. Kat
Kim Possible
Lab Rats
Mech-X4
Milo Murphy's Law
Monster Buster Club
Pair of Kings
Phineas and Ferb
Penn Zero: Part-Time Hero
Pickle and Peanut
Pokémon
Randy Cunningham: 9th Grade Ninja
Redakai: Conquer the Kairu
The Replacements
The Suite Life on Deck
Spider-Man (1994)
Spider-Man (2017)
Star vs. the Forces of Evil
Star Wars Rebels
Star Wars Resistance
Totally Spies!
The Ghost and Molly McGee
The Owl House
Ultimate Spider-Man
Wander Over Yonder
What's With Andy?
X-Men
Yin Yang Yo!
Zeke and Luther

References

Disney XD
Television channels in Poland
Television channels and stations established in 2009